Jonathan da Silveira Fernandes Reis (born 21 February 1995), simply known as Fernandes, is a Brazilian professional footballer who plays as a midfielder.

Club career
Born in Rio de Janeiro, Fernandes joined Botafogo's youth setup in 2005, aged ten. On 4 January 2015, he was promoted to the first team in Série B.

Fernandes made his senior debut on 31 January 2015, coming on as a second half substitute for Gegê in a 1–0 Campeonato Carioca home win against Boavista. His first goal in the competition came on 7 February, the last of a 4–0 home routing of Bonsucesso.

Fernandes contributed with two goals in 17 appearances during the year's Série B, as his side achieved promotion as champions, and renewed his contract until 2018 on 30 November 2015. He made his Série A debut on 15 May 2016, starting in a 0–1 home loss against São Paulo.

Fernandes scored his first goal in the top tier on 22 May 2016, netting the equalizer in a 1–1 draw at Sport.

On 21 August 2020, Fernandes signs with Bashundhara Kings in Bangladesh Football Premier League.

On 22 December 2020, Fernandes debuted for Bashundhara Kings in 2020–21 Bangladesh Federation Cup. He also represented the club at the 2021 AFC Cup.

Career statistics

Club 
As of 20 September 2021

Honours
Botafogo
Campeonato Brasileiro Série B: 2015
Bashundhara Kings
Bangladesh Premier League: 2020–21
Bangladesh Federation Cup: 2020–21

References

External links

1995 births
Living people
Brazilian footballers
Brazilian expatriate footballers
Footballers from Rio de Janeiro (city)
Association football midfielders
Campeonato Brasileiro Série A players
Campeonato Brasileiro Série B players
Bangladesh Premier League players
Botafogo de Futebol e Regatas players
Atlético Clube Goianiense players
Guarani FC players
Esporte Clube São Bento players
Bashundhara Kings players
Brazilian expatriate sportspeople in Bangladesh
Expatriate footballers in Bangladesh